1918 in Argentine football saw Racing Club de Avellaneda win its 6th. consecutive league title, remaining unbeaten at the end of the season.

In international football Argentina won three minor championships.

Primera División

Defensores de Belgrano debuted in Primera after promoting last year, while Argentino de Quilmes and Ferro Carril Oeste (which was also expelled from the Association) were relegated.

Lower divisions

Intermedia
Champion: Eureka

Segunda División
Champion: San Fernando

Domestic cups

Copa de Honor Municipalidad de Buenos Aires
Champion: Independiente

Final

Copa de Competencia Jockey Club
Champion: Porteño

Final

Copa Ibarguren
Champion: Racing Club

Final

International cups

Tie Cup
Champion:  Wanderers

Final

Copa de Honor Cousenier
Champion:  Peñarol

Final

Copa Dr. Ricardo C. Aldao
Champion:  Racing Club

Final

Argentina national team

Titles
Copa Lipton 1918
Copa Newton 1918
Copa Premier Honor Argentino 1918

Results

References

 
Seasons in Argentine football